The Young Achievers Awards is a national competition held annually in Uganda which selects and promotes the best practice and excellence in youth creativity. The following is the list of Young Achievers Award winners.
 It provides an opportunity for people from all walks of life to work together to address national developmental challenges in ICT, the Arts, Health, Education, Gender and access to better lives.

2011 Winners 

Media and Society
Nigel M. Nassar
Grace Atuhaire
Bushra Namirembe
Nixion Jet Tumusiime
Racheal Yiga

Film and Television
Abubakar Muwonge
Humphrey Nabimanya
Isaac nekimiah Oboth
Usama Mukwaya
Shawn kimuli
Q
Music
Keko Jocelyne Tracy
Ivan Earl Agaba
Tabu Flo Dance Company
Walakira Richard
Joseph Mwima

Arts, Fashion and Culture
Brenda Nuwagaba
Patricia Kamara Ainembabazi
Beatrice Lamwaka
Karen Kemiyondo Coutinho
Bruno Ruganzu Tusingwire

Leadership and governance 
Moses Okot
Manige Merabu
Steven arinitwe
Joseph Odumna

Sports
Annet Negesa
Regina atheino
Justine Kimono
Benjamin Komakech
Davis Arinaitwe Karashani

Environment 
Vianney Tumwesigye
Rehema Nakyazze
Mugisha Moses
Ssenyonjo Julius 
Roay Rosenblith

Business and Trade
Aron Ahikiriza
Eva kabejja
Gerald katabazi
Martin Ssali
Brian Mugisha Niwagaba

ICT
Billy Branks Kaye
Albert Mucunguzi
Mordecai Musonge
Joseph Owino
Nashaba Victor
Arthur Ntozi

2013 Winners 

Media and Journalism award
Flavia Tumusiime 
 
Outstanding performing Arts
Keneth kimuli

Ericsson Innovation excellence Award
Davis Musinguzi

Farming and Agro-Processing
Eric and Rebecca Kaduru

Leadership and Social Enterprise

Sports Personality Award
Phiona Mutesi

Heroes Award
Esther Kalenzi

Lifetime Achievement Award
James Mulwana

Star Hall of Fame
Phiona Mutesi

2017 Winners 

Media and Journalism award
Ronald Wandera
Creative Arts (Fashion)
Brian Ahumuza

Creative Arts (Music)
Milege

Social Entrepreneurship Award
Muhammed Kisirisa

Innovations & ICT Award
Gerald Otim

Farming and Agro-Processing
Zilla Mary Arach

Business Award
Ricky Rapa Thompson

Sports Personality Award

Heroes Award

Lifetime Achievement Award

Star Hall of Fame
Amelia Kyambadde

References 

Young_Achievers_Award_winners
Young_Achievers_Award_winners
Young_Achievers_Award_winners